Kafr Saqr is one of the oldest centers and the seat of a markaz, markaz Kafr Saqr of the Sharqia Governorate of Egypt.

Notable persons
Ahmed Subhy Mansour, Islamic scholar, cleric, and founder of the Quranists, who was exiled from Egypt, and lives in the United States as a political refugee.
Abdallah Abdel Maguid Ahmed Badawi, a local native and an agricultural engineer. First president of Kafr Sakr City council by appointment by President Gamal Abdel Nasser.
Ihab Abdelrahman, an athlete
Ghada Abdel Razek, an actress

See also

 List of cities and towns in Egypt

References

Populated places in Sharqia Governorate